The 1893 Cornell Big Red football team was an American football team that represented Cornell University during the 1893 college football season.  The team compiled a 3–5–1 record.

Schedule

References

Cornell
Cornell Big Red football seasons
Cornell Big Red football